Woodville is an unincorporated community in Rappahannock County, Virginia, United States. It is located in the southern part of the county.

Notable residents
Eugene McCarthy, politician (1916–2005)
James J. Kilpatrick, columnist (1920–2010), since moved to Washington, D.C.
Gerald Hawkins, astronomer (1928-2003), recognized the astronomical significance of prehistorical sites such as Stonehenge
John Jackson, (1924-2002), famous Piedmont style finger picking blues musician, moved to Fairfax County 
Emily Jane Hilscher, first student killed on April 16, 2007 in the Virginia Tech Shooting

External links
Information from Rappahannock County, Virginia site (maintained by Rappahannock County Administration)
 Link to bluesworld.com

Unincorporated communities in Rappahannock County, Virginia
Unincorporated communities in Virginia